Friday Night Funk for Saturday Night Brothers is an album by jazz saxophonist Rusty Bryant recorded for the Prestige label in 1972.

Reception

The Allmusic site awarded the album 4 stars.

Track listing
 "Friday Night Funk for Saturday Night Brothers" (Kenneth Moss) - 6:35   
 "Down By the Cuyahoga" (Fred Masey) - 8:35   
 "Have You Seen Her" (Barbara Acklin, Eugene Record) - 5:30   
 "Mercy, Mercy, Mercy" (Joe Zawinul) - 7:00   
 "Blues for a Brother" (Rusty Bryant) - 8:05

Personnel
Rusty Bryant - alto saxophone, tenor saxophone
Kenneth Moss - electric piano, organ
Harold Young - guitar
Eddie Brookshine - electric bass
Fred Masey - drums
Norman Jones - congas, percussion

Production
 Ozzie Cadena - producer
 Rudy Van Gelder - engineer

References

Rusty Bryant albums
1972 albums
Prestige Records albums
Albums produced by Ozzie Cadena
Albums recorded at Van Gelder Studio